Terengganu Hockey Team (Malay: Pasukan Hoki Terengganu), is a professional hockey club based in Kuala Terengganu, Terengganu, Malaysia, that competes in Malaysia Premier League, the first division of the Malaysian Hockey League. The club was founded as Terengganu Hockey Team in 2013.

Players

Current squad

Honours

Malaysia Hockey League
  League
 Winners (3): 2014, 2015, 2016
 Overall
 Winners (4): 2014, 2015, 2016, 2017

References

See also
 Malaysia Hockey League
 PenyuSukan.com - Artikel Berkaitan - TERENGGANU HOCKEY TEAM (THT)

Malaysian field hockey clubs
Field hockey clubs established in 2013
2013 establishments in Malaysia